Robert Menne (born February 19, 1942) is an American professional golfer who has played on the PGA Tour, the Champions Tour and the European Seniors Tour.

Menne was born and raised in Gardner, Massachusetts, where he was graduated from Gardner High School in 1960. He attended college at the University of Miami in the early 1960s, and turned pro in 1965. Menne had at least seven top-10 finishes in PGA Tour events during his career including a win at the 1974 Kemper Open, which was held at the Quail Hollow Club in Charlotte, North Carolina. He won that tournament in a playoff with Jerry Heard. Menne also finished in a first-place tie with Lee Trevino at the end of regulation at the 1970 National Airlines Open Invitational but lost on the second extra hole of a playoff. His best finish in a major was a T-30 at the 1970 PGA Championship.

After reaching the age of 50, Menne played some on the Champions Tour but with limited success. His best finish in a Champions Tour event was T11 at Raley's Senior Gold Rush in 1992. He has had more success playing on the European Seniors Tour.

Menne lives in West Palm Beach, Florida. He had previously lived in Demarest, New Jersey.

Professional wins (7)

PGA Tour wins (1)

PGA Tour playoff record (1–1)

Other wins (6)
1969 New England PGA Championship
1975 Maine Open
1981 Massachusetts Open
1985 New England Open
1988 New England PGA Championship
1991 Rhode Island Open

U.S. national team appearances
PGA Cup: 1988 (winners)

References

External links

American male golfers
PGA Tour golfers
PGA Tour Champions golfers
European Senior Tour golfers
Golfers from Massachusetts
Golfers from New Jersey
Golfers from Florida
University of Miami alumni
Sportspeople from Worcester County, Massachusetts
People from Gardner, Massachusetts
People from Demarest, New Jersey
Sportspeople from Bergen County, New Jersey
Sportspeople from West Palm Beach, Florida
1942 births
Living people